Buenavista station may refer to:

 Buenavista railway station, operated since 2008 by Ferrocarriles Suburbanos
 Buenavista railway station (old), formerly operated by Ferrocarriles Nacionales de México; opened in 1873
 Buenavista metro station, a Mexico City Metro station; opened in 1999
 Cablebús Buenavista, an aerial lift station in Mexico City; opened in 2021
 Metrobús Buenavista (Line 1), a BRT station in Mexico City; opened in 2005
 Metrobús Buenavista (Line 3), a BRT station in Mexico City; opened in 2011
 Metrobús Buenavista (Line 4), a BRT station in Mexico City; opened in 2012
 Mexibús Buenavista, a BRT station in Tultitlán, State of Mexico; opened in 2015

See also 
 Buenavista (disambiguation)
 Buona Vista MRT station, a MRT station in Queenstown, Singapore; opened in 1988